Helheim Glacier is a glacier in the Sermersooq municipality, Eastern Greenland.

This glacier is named after Helheim, the world of the dead in Norse Mythology.

Geography
The Helheim Glacier is located on the eastern side of the Greenland ice sheet. It is one of Greenland's largest outlet glaciers. 
It flows roughly in an ESE direction and feeds the waters of the Helheim Fjord, a branch at the northern end of the Sermilik (Egede og Rothes Fjord) system, where there are a number of other glaciers calving and discharging at rapid rates such as the Fenris and the Midgard Glacier.

Retreat
Like many of Greenland's outlet glaciers, it is a common site where glacial earthquakes are monitored.

See also
List of glaciers in Greenland

References

External links

 Glaciers Not On Simple, Upward Trend Of Melting sciencedaily.com, Feb. 21, 2007 "Two of Greenland's largest glaciers (Kangerdlugssuaq and Helheim) shrank dramatically ... between 2004 and 2005. And then, less than two years later, they returned to near their previous rates of discharge.
Ice flow in Greenland for the International Polar Year 2008/2009
 Video of the Week: Massive Calving Event at Helheim Glacier: Arley Titzler, GlacierHub

Glaciers of Greenland